Joachim Hansen may refer to:

 Joachim Hansen (actor) (1930–2007), German actor
 Joachim Hansen (fighter), Norwegian mixed martial artist
 Joachim B. Hansen (born 1990), Danish golfer